Wolf-Christian von Ditfurth (born March 14, 1953) is a German author and historian.  He was a member of the German Communist Party from 1973 to 1983. In January 1998, he joined the SPD, remaining a member for two years.   During the twenty-first century he has not joined a political party.

As a journalist, Ditfurth has published numerous articles in Der Spiegel. Since 1999 also been a writer of sensational and detective novels.

A member of the Ditfurth family, his father Hoimar von Ditfurth was a journalist, doctor, popular television presenter and writer, while his sister, Jutta Ditfurth, is a journalist and politician.

References

1953 births
Living people
Writers from Würzburg
20th-century German historians
German Communist Party politicians
Social Democratic Party of Germany politicians
German male non-fiction writers